The Odd Fellows' Hall in Beverly, Massachusetts occupies a prominent location on Cabot Street opposite city hall in Beverly Center.  It is a -story High Gothic Revival building constructed in 1893 to a design by local architect J. Foster Ober.  Its exterior is clad in brick with trim of granite and brownstone.  Its roof is a cross gable style, steep roof with polychrome bands of slate tiles.  The central portion of the roof is a deck surrounded by a wrought iron railing and is topped by a cupola and weathervane.  One of its notable tenants was President William Howard Taft, who had offices in the building during summer residencies in Beverly.

The building was listed on the National Register of Historic Places in 1978, and included in the Beverly Center Business District in 1984.

See also
National Register of Historic Places listings in Essex County, Massachusetts

References

Cultural infrastructure completed in 1874
Clubhouses on the National Register of Historic Places in Massachusetts
Odd Fellows buildings in Massachusetts
Buildings and structures in Beverly, Massachusetts
National Register of Historic Places in Essex County, Massachusetts
Historic district contributing properties in Massachusetts